"Welcome Home" also known as "Welcome Home (You)" is a single by Backstreet Boys member Brian Littrell. It was the first single from his first solo album Welcome Home, and it was written by Littrell and Dan Muckala. Littrell wrote his part in Vienna, Austria when he was touring with the Backstreet Boys. This song was also featured in the compilation album WOW Hits 2007.

The single reached #2 on the US Christian AC Charts. It was also #1 for 3 weeks on the US Christian Inspirational charts.

Music video
The music video includes Littrell singing and playing his guitar, and showing glimpses of a father-and-son, from the time when the son as a child went to school, to when the son has grown into a young man going off to the military. In the middle of the song, the father sees on television that his son is MIA (Missing in Action), just when he had received a written letter from that son. At the end, the son comes back has returned home safely with the other soldiers. Littrell's wife Leighanne and son Baylee were seen in the video. The ghosts of some soldiers come back too, and people who lost their daughters/sons can see them before they go into Heaven.

In an alternate ending of the video, Littrell is seen walking off into the distance on a set of train tracks.

Awards

In 2007, the song was nominated to a Dove Award for Short Form Music Video of the Year at the 38th GMA Dove Awards.

Charts

Weekly charts

Year-end charts

References

2006 singles
2006 songs
Brian Littrell songs
Jive Records singles
Music videos directed by Roman White
Songs written by Brian Littrell
Songs written by Dan Muckala